Bongeunsa Station is a station on Seoul Subway Line 9 that opened on March 28, 2015.

Station layout

Gallery

See also
Bongeunsa
COEX Convention & Exhibition Center

References

Seoul Metropolitan Subway stations
Metro stations in Gangnam District
Railway stations opened in 2015
2015 establishments in South Korea